Juan Escoiquiz Morata (1762 – 27 November 1820) was a Spanish ecclesiastic, politician and writer born in Ocaña in 1762. His father was a general officer and he began life as a page in the court of King Charles III. He entered the church and was provided for by a prebend at Zaragoza. In his memoirs, Manuel de Godoy asserts that Escoiquiz sought to gain his favor by flattery. There is every reason to believe that this is an accurate statement of the ease. The mere fact that he was selected to be the tutor of the heir-apparent, Ferdinand, afterwards King Ferdinand VII, is of itself a proof that he exerted himself to gain the goodwill of the reigning favorite.

In 1797 he published a translation of Young's Night Thoughts, which does not of itself show that he was well acquainted with English, for the version may have been made with the help of the French. In 1798 he published a long and worthless so-called epic on the conquest of Mexico. Escoiquiz was in fact a busy and pushing member of the literary clique which looked up to Godoy as its patron. But his position as tutor to the heir to the throne excited his ambition.

He began to hope that he might play the part of those court ecclesiastics who had often had an active share in the government of Spain. As Ferdinand grew up, and after his marriage with a Neapolitan princess, he became the center of a court opposition to Godoy and to his policy of alliance with France. Escoiquiz was the brains, as far as there were any brains, of the intrigue. His activity was so notorious that he was exiled from court, but was consoled by a canonry at Toledo. This half measure was as ineffective as was to have been expected. Escoiquiz continued to be in constant communication with the prince. Toledo is close to Madrid, and the correspondence was easily maintained.

He had a large share in the conspiracy of the Escorial which was detected on 28 October 1807. He was imprisoned and sent for trial with other conspirators. But as they had appealed to Napoleon, who would not suffer his name to be mentioned, the government had to allow the matter to be quieted, and the prisoners were acquitted. After the outbreak at Aranjuez on 17 March 1808, in which he had a share, he became one of the most trusted advisers of Ferdinand. The new king's decision to go to meet Napoleon at Bayonne was largely inspired by him. In 1814 Escoiquiz published at Madrid his Idea Sencilla de las razones que motivaron el viage del Rey Fernando VII a Bayona ("Honest representation of the causes which inspired the journey of King Ferdinand VII to Bayonne").

It is a valuable historical document, and contains a singularly vivid account of an interview with Napoleon. Escoiquiz was far too firmly convinced of his ingenuity and merits to conceal the delusions and follies of himself and his associates. He displays his own vanity, frivolity and futile cleverness with much unconscious humour, but, it is only fair to allow, with some literary dexterity. When the Spanish royal family was imprisoned by Napoleon, Escoiquiz remained with Ferdinand at Valençay. In 1813 he published at Bourges a translation of John Milton's Paradise Lost.

When Ferdinand was released in 1814 he came back to Madrid in the hope that his ambition would now be satisfied, but the king was tired of him, and was moreover resolved never to be subjected by any favorite. After a very brief period of office in 1815 he was sent as a prisoner to Murcia. Though he was afterwards recalled, he was again exiled to Ronda, where he died on 27 November 1820.

References

External links

1762 births
1820 deaths
People from the Province of Toledo
Spanish clergy
Spanish politicians
Spanish Roman Catholic priests
Spanish translators
Spanish male writers
18th-century Spanish writers
19th-century Spanish writers
English–Spanish translators
French–Spanish translators
Spanish people of Basque descent